National Route 77 is a national highway in South Korea connects Jung District, Busan to Paju. It was established on 25 August 2001.

Main stopovers
 Busan
 Jung District - Seo District - Saha District - Gangseo District
 South Gyeongsang Province
 Changwon - Goseong County - Tongyeong - Goseong County - Sacheon - Namhae County
 South Jeolla Province
 Yeosu - Goheung County - Boseong County - Jangheung County - Gangjin County - Wando County - Haenam County - Mokpo - Sinan County - Muan County - Yeonggwang County
 North Jeolla Province
 Gochang County - Buan County - Gunsan
 South Chungcheong Province
 Seocheon County - Boryeong - Taean County - Seosan - Dangjin - Asan
 Gyeonggi Province
 Pyeongtaek - Hwaseong - Ansan - Siheung
 Incheon
 Namdong District - Yeonsu District - Michuhol District - Jung District - Dong District - Michuhol District - Dong District - Seo District - Gyeyang District
 Gyeonggi Province
 Bucheon
 Seoul
 Gangseo District
 Gyeonggi Province
 Bucheon
 Seoul
 Gangseo District - Yeongdeungpo District - Mapo District
 Gyeonggi Province
 Goyang - Paju

Major intersections

 (■): Motorway
IS: Intersection, IC: Interchange

Busan

South Gyeongsang Province

South Jeolla Province

North Jeolla Province

South Chungcheong Province

Gyeonggi Province (South of Incheon)

Incheon

Gyeonggi Province Bucheon

Seoul

Gyeonggi Province (North of Han River)

References

77
Roads in Busan
Roads in South Jeolla
Roads in North Jeolla
Roads in South Gyeongsang
Roads in South Chungcheong
Roads in Incheon
Roads in Gyeonggi
Roads in Seoul